Khon Kaen may refer to
the town Khon Kaen
Khon Kaen, Mueang Roi Et a sub-District (tambon) of Mueang Roi Et District, Roi Et Province, Thailand
Khon Kaen Province
Mueang Khon Kaen district
Khon Kaen University
Khon Kaen Airport